Cumilla Government College is a college in Comilla, Bangladesh. It is one of the oldest colleges in Comilla as well as in Chittagong division. The college is located on three acres of land including its intermediate and honors section.

Academic departments

See also
List of Educational Institutions in Comilla

References

Colleges in Comilla District
1964 establishments in East Pakistan
Education in Cumilla
Universities and colleges in Cumilla District